Giacomo Puosi (born 30 March 1946) is an Italian former sprinter who competed in the 1968 Summer Olympics and in the 1972 Summer Olympics.

Biography

Achievements

National titles
1 win in 200 metres at the Italian Athletics Championships (1970)

See also
 Italy national relay team

References

External links
 

1946 births
Living people
Italian male sprinters
Olympic athletes of Italy
Athletes (track and field) at the 1968 Summer Olympics
Athletes (track and field) at the 1972 Summer Olympics
European Athletics Championships medalists
Mediterranean Games gold medalists for Italy
Athletes (track and field) at the 1967 Mediterranean Games
Mediterranean Games medalists in athletics
Italian Athletics Championships winners
20th-century Italian people